Svante August Arrhenius (19 February 1859 – 2 October 1927) was a Swedish scientist. Originally a physicist, but often referred to as a chemist, Arrhenius was one of the founders of the science of physical chemistry. He received the Nobel Prize for Chemistry in 1903, becoming the first Swedish Nobel laureate. In 1905, he became director of the Nobel Institute, where he remained until his death.

Arrhenius was the first to use principles of physical chemistry to estimate the extent to which increases in atmospheric carbon dioxide are responsible for the Earth's increasing surface temperature. His work played an important role in the emergence of modern climate science. In the 1960s, Charles David Keeling demonstrated that the quantity of human-caused carbon dioxide emissions into the air is enough to cause global warming.

The Arrhenius equation, Arrhenius acid, Arrhenius base, lunar crater Arrhenius, Martian crater Arrhenius, the mountain of Arrheniusfjellet, and the Arrhenius Labs at Stockholm University were so named to commemorate his contributions to science.

Biography

Early years
Arrhenius was born on 19 February 1859 at Vik (also spelled Wik or Wijk), near Uppsala, Kingdom of Sweden, United Kingdoms of Sweden and Norway, the son of Svante Gustav and Carolina Thunberg Arrhenius, who were Lutheran. His father had been a land surveyor for Uppsala University, moving up to a supervisory position. At the age of three, Arrhenius taught himself to read without the encouragement of his parents and, by watching his father's addition of numbers in his account books, became an arithmetical prodigy. In later life, Arrhenius was profoundly passionate about mathematical concepts, data analysis and discovering their relationships and laws.

At age eight, he entered the local cathedral school, starting in the fifth grade, distinguishing himself in physics and mathematics, and graduating as the youngest and most able student in 1876.

Ionic disassociation
At the University of Uppsala, he was dissatisfied with the chief instructor of physics and the only faculty member who could have supervised him in chemistry, Per Teodor Cleve, so he left to study at the Physical Institute of the Swedish Academy of Sciences in Stockholm under the physicist Erik Edlund in 1881.

His work focused on the conductivities of electrolytes. In 1884, based on this work, he submitted a 150-page dissertation on electrolytic conductivity to Uppsala for the doctorate. It did not impress the professors, who included Cleve, and he received a fourth-class degree, but upon his defense it was reclassified as third-class. Later, extensions of this very work would earn him the 1903 Nobel Prize in Chemistry.

Arrhenius put forth 56 theses in his 1884 dissertation, most of which would still be accepted today unchanged or with minor modifications. The most important idea in the dissertation was his explanation of the fact that solid crystalline salts disassociate into paired charged particles when dissolved, for which he would win the 1903 Nobel Prize in Chemistry. Arrhenius's explanation was that in forming a solution, the salt disassociates into charged particles that Michael Faraday had given the name ions many years earlier. Faraday's belief had been that ions were produced in the process of electrolysis, that is, an external direct current source of electricity was necessary to form ions. Arrhenius proposed that, even in the absence of an electric current, aqueous solutions of salts contained ions. He thus proposed that chemical reactions in solution were reactions between ions.

The dissertation did not impress the professors at Uppsala, but Arrhenius sent it to a number of scientists in Europe who were developing the new science of physical chemistry, such as Rudolf Clausius, Wilhelm Ostwald, and Jacobus Henricus van 't Hoff. 
They were far more impressed, and Ostwald even came to Uppsala to persuade Arrhenius to join his research team. Arrhenius declined, however, as he preferred to stay in Sweden-Norway for a while (his father was very ill and would die in 1885) and had received an appointment at Uppsala.

In an extension of his ionic theory Arrhenius proposed definitions for acids and bases, in 1884. He believed that acids were substances that produce hydrogen ions in solution and that bases were substances that produce hydroxide ions in solution.

Middle period

In 1885, Arrhenius next received a travel grant from the Swedish Academy of Sciences, which enabled him to study with Ostwald in Riga (now in Latvia), with Friedrich Kohlrausch in Würzburg, Germany, with Ludwig Boltzmann in Graz, Austria, and with Jacobus Henricus van 't Hoff in Amsterdam.

In 1889, Arrhenius explained the fact that most reactions require added heat energy to proceed by formulating the concept of activation energy, an energy barrier that must be overcome before two molecules will react. The Arrhenius equation gives the quantitative basis of the relationship between the activation energy and the rate at which a reaction proceeds.

In 1891, he became a lecturer at the Stockholm University College (Stockholms Högskola, now Stockholm University), being promoted to professor of physics (with much opposition) in 1895, and rector in 1896.

Nobel Prizes
About 1900, Arrhenius became involved in setting up the Nobel Institutes and the Nobel Prizes. He was elected a member of the Royal Swedish Academy of Sciences in 1901. For the rest of his life, he would be a member of the Nobel Committee on Physics and a de facto member of the Nobel Committee on Chemistry.  He used his positions to arrange prizes for his friends (Jacobus van 't Hoff, Wilhelm Ostwald, Theodore Richards) and to attempt to deny them to his enemies (Paul Ehrlich, Walther Nernst, Dmitri Mendeleev). In 1901 Arrhenius was elected to the Swedish Academy of Sciences, against strong opposition. In 1903 he became the first Swede to be awarded the Nobel Prize in Chemistry. 
In 1905, upon the founding of the Nobel Institute for Physical Research at Stockholm, he was appointed rector of the institute, the position where he remained until retirement in 1927.

In 1911, he won the first Willard Gibbs Award.

Society memberships

He was elected an Honorary Member of the Netherlands Chemical Society in 1909.

He became a Foreign Member of the Royal Society (ForMemRS) in 1910.

In 1912, he was elected a Foreign Honorary Member of the American Academy of Arts and Sciences

In 1919, he became foreign member of the Royal Netherlands Academy of Arts and Sciences.

Later years

Eventually, Arrhenius's theories became generally accepted and he turned to other scientific topics. In 1902, he began to investigate physiological problems in terms of chemical theory. He determined that reactions in living organisms and in the test tube followed the same laws.

In 1904, he delivered at the University of California a course of lectures, the object of which was to illustrate the application of the methods of physical chemistry to the study of the theory of toxins and antitoxins, and which were published in 1907 under the title Immunochemistry.
He also turned his attention to geology (the origin of ice ages), astronomy, physical cosmology, and astrophysics, accounting for the birth of the Solar System by interstellar collision. 
He considered radiation pressure as accounting for comets, the solar corona, the aurora borealis, and zodiacal light.

He thought life might have been carried from planet to planet by the transport of spores, the theory now known as panspermia. He thought of the idea of a universal language, proposing a modification of the English language.

He was a board member for the Swedish Society for Racial Hygiene (founded 1909), which endorsed mendelism at the time, and contributed to the topic of contraceptives around 1910. However, until 1938 information and sale of contraceptives was prohibited in the Kingdom of Sweden. Gordon Stein wrote that Svante Arrhenius was an atheist. In his last years he wrote both textbooks and popular books, trying to emphasize the need for further work on the topics he discussed. In September 1927, he came down with an attack of acute intestinal catarrh and died on 2 October. He was buried in Uppsala.

Marriages and family
He was married twice, first to his former pupil Sofia Rudbeck (1894–1896), with whom he had one son, and then to Maria Johansson (1905–1927), with whom he had two daughters and a son.

Arrhenius was the grandfather of bacteriologist Agnes Wold, chemist , and ocean biogeochemist .

Greenhouse effect

In developing a theory to explain the ice ages, Arrhenius, in 1896, was the first to use basic principles of physical chemistry to calculate estimates of the extent to which increases in atmospheric carbon dioxide (CO2) will increase Earth's surface temperature through the greenhouse effect. These calculations led him to conclude that human-caused CO2 emissions, from fossil-fuel burning and other combustion processes, are large enough to cause global warming. This conclusion has been extensively tested, winning a place at the core of modern climate science. Arrhenius, in this work, built upon the prior work of other famous scientists, including Joseph Fourier, John Tyndall and Claude Pouillet. Arrhenius wanted to determine whether greenhouse gases could contribute to the explanation of the temperature variation between glacial and inter-glacial periods. Arrhenius used infrared observations of the moon – by Frank Washington Very and Samuel Pierpont Langley at the Allegheny Observatory in Pittsburgh – to calculate how much of infrared (heat) radiation is captured by CO2 and water (H2O) vapour in Earth's atmosphere. Using 'Stefan's law' (better known as the Stefan–Boltzmann law), he formulated what he referred to as a 'rule'. 
In its original form, Arrhenius's rule reads as follows:
if the quantity of carbonic acid increases in geometric progression, the augmentation of the temperature will increase nearly in arithmetic progression.
Here, Arrhenius refers to CO2 as carbonic acid (which refers only to the aqueous form H2CO3 in modern usage). The following formulation of Arrhenius's rule is still in use today:

Derivations from atmospheric radiative transfer models have found that  (alpha) for CO2 is 5.35 (± 10%) W/m2 for Earth's atmosphere.

Based on information from his colleague Arvid Högbom, Arrhenius was the first person to predict that emissions of carbon dioxide from the burning of fossil fuels and other combustion processes were large enough to cause global warming. In his calculation Arrhenius included the feedback from changes in water vapor as well as latitudinal effects, but he omitted clouds, convection of heat upward in the atmosphere, and other essential factors. His work is currently seen less as an accurate quantification of global warming than as the first demonstration that increases in atmospheric CO2 will cause global warming, everything else being equal.

Arrhenius's absorption values for CO2 and his conclusions met criticism by Knut Ångström in 1900, who published the first modern infrared absorption spectrum of CO2 with two absorption bands, and published experimental results that seemed to show that absorption of infrared radiation by the gas in the atmosphere was already "saturated" so that adding more could make no difference. Arrhenius replied strongly in 1901 (Annalen der Physik), dismissing the critique altogether. He touched on the subject briefly in a technical book titled Lehrbuch der kosmischen Physik (1903). He later wrote Världarnas utveckling (1906) (German: Das Werden der Welten [1907], English: Worlds in the Making [1908]) directed at a general audience, where he suggested that the human emission of CO2 would be strong enough to prevent the world from entering a new ice age, and that a warmer earth would be needed to feed the rapidly increasing population:

 "To a certain extent the temperature of the earth's surface, as we shall presently see, is conditioned by the properties of the atmosphere surrounding it, and particularly by the permeability of the latter for the rays of heat." (p. 46)

 "That the atmospheric envelopes limit the heat losses from the planets had been suggested about 1800 by the great French physicist Fourier. His ideas were further developed afterwards by Pouillet and Tyndall. Their theory has been styled the hot-house theory, because they thought that the atmosphere acted after the manner of the glass panes of hot-houses." (p. 51)

 "If the quantity of carbonic acid [ CO2 + H2O → H2CO3 (carbonic acid) ] in the air should sink to one-half its present percentage, the temperature would fall by about 4°; a diminution to one-quarter would reduce the temperature by 8°. On the other hand, any doubling of the percentage of carbon dioxide in the air would raise the temperature of the earth's surface by 4°; and if the carbon dioxide were increased fourfold, the temperature would rise by 8°." (p. 53)

 "Although the sea, by absorbing carbonic acid, acts as a regulator of huge capacity, which takes up about five-sixths of the produced carbonic acid, we yet recognize that the slight percentage of carbonic acid in the atmosphere may by the advances of industry be changed to a noticeable degree in the course of a few centuries." (p. 54)

 "Since, now, warm ages have alternated with glacial periods, even after man appeared on the earth, we have to ask ourselves: Is it probable that we shall in the coming geological ages be visited by a new ice period that will drive us from our temperate countries into the hotter climates of Africa? There does not appear to be much ground for such an apprehension. The enormous combustion of coal by our industrial establishments suffices to increase the percentage of carbon dioxide in the air to a perceptible degree." (p. 61)

 "We often hear lamentations that the coal stored up in the earth is wasted by the present generation without any thought of the future, and we are terrified by the awful destruction of life and property which has followed the volcanic eruptions of our days. We may find a kind of consolation in the consideration that here, as in every other case, there is good mixed with the evil. By the influence of the increasing percentage of carbonic acid in the atmosphere, we may hope to enjoy ages with more equable and better climates, especially as regards the colder regions of the earth, ages when the earth will bring forth much more abundant crops than at present, for the benefit of rapidly propagating mankind." (p. 63)

At this time, the accepted consensus explanation is that, historically, orbital forcing has set the timing for ice ages, with CO2 acting as an essential amplifying feedback. However, CO2 releases since the industrial revolution have increased CO2 to a level not found since 10 to 15 million years ago, when the global average surface temperature was up to  warmer than now and almost all ice had melted, raising world sea-levels to about 100 feet (30 m.) higher than today's.

Arrhenius estimated based on the CO2 levels at his time, that reducing levels by 0.62–0.55 would decrease temperatures by 4–5 °C (Celsius) and an increase of 2.5 to 3 times of CO2 would cause a temperature rise of 8–9 °C in the Arctic. In his book Worlds in the Making he described the "hot-house" theory of the atmosphere.

Works 
1884, Recherches sur la conductibilité galvanique des électrolytes, doctoral dissertation, Stockholm, Royal publishing house, P. A. Norstedt & Söner, 155 pages.
1896a, Ueber den Einfluss des Atmosphärischen Kohlensäurengehalts auf die Temperatur der Erdoberfläche, in the Proceedings of the Royal Swedish Academy of Science, Stockholm 1896, Volume 22, I N. 1, pages 1–101.
1896b, On the Influence of Carbonic Acid in the Air upon the Temperature of the Ground, London, Edinburgh, and Dublin Philosophical Magazine and Journal of Science (fifth series), April 1896. vol 41, pages 237–275.
1901a, Ueber die Wärmeabsorption durch Kohlensäure, Annalen der Physik, Vol 4, 1901, pages 690–705.
1901b, Über Die Wärmeabsorption Durch Kohlensäure Und Ihren Einfluss Auf Die Temperatur Der Erdoberfläche. Abstract of the proceedings of the Royal Academy of Science, 58, 25–58.
 Arrhenius, Svante. Die Verbreitung des Lebens im Weltenraum. Die Umschau, Frankfurt a. M., 7, 1903, 481–486.
 
 
1906, Die vermutliche Ursache der Klimaschwankungen, Meddelanden från K. Vetenskapsakademiens Nobelinstitut, Vol 1 No 2, pages 1–10
1908, Das Werden der Welten (Worlds in the making; the evolution of the universe), Academic Publishing House, Leipzig, 208 pages.

See also

Activation energy
Arrhenius acid
Arrhenius law
Arrhenius plot
Néel–Arrhenius theory
History of climate change science
James Croll
Eunice Newton Foote
George Perkins Marsh
Milutin Milanković
Greta Thunberg – climate activist and distant relative of Arrhenius
Viscosity models for mixtures

References

Sources

Further reading

External links

 
 "Enter the Anthropocene: Climate Science in the Early 20th Century," podcast about Arrhenius, Guy Callendar, and Charles David Keeling, Initial Conditions, Episode 2
  including the Nobel Lecture, December 11, 1903 Development of the Theory of Electrolytic Dissociation
 A Tribute to the Memory of Svante Arrhenius (1859–1927) – a scientist ahead of his time, published in 2008 by the Royal Swedish Academy of Engineering Sciences
 Svante Arrhenius (1859–1927)
 Obs 50 (1927) 363 – Obituary (one paragraph)
 PASP 39 (1927) 385 – Obituary (one paragraph)
 "On the influence of Carbonic Acid in the Air upon the Temperature of the Ground", Arrhenius, 1896, online and analyzed on BibNum [click 'à télécharger' for English analysis]
 

1859 births
1927 deaths
People from Uppsala Municipality
Nobel laureates in Chemistry
Swedish physical chemists
20th-century Swedish astronomers
Panspermia
Academic staff of Stockholm University
Uppsala University alumni
Academic staff of Riga Technical University
Members of the Royal Netherlands Academy of Arts and Sciences
Members of the Royal Swedish Academy of Sciences
Members of the Royal Academy of Belgium
Foreign Members of the Royal Society
Foreign associates of the National Academy of Sciences
Corresponding members of the Saint Petersburg Academy of Sciences
Honorary Members of the USSR Academy of Sciences
Swedish Nobel laureates
Faraday Lecturers
Fellows of the American Academy of Arts and Sciences
Members of the Royal Society of Sciences and Letters in Gothenburg
Burials at Uppsala old cemetery
Members of the Göttingen Academy of Sciences and Humanities
Members of the Royal Society of Sciences in Uppsala